General elections were held in Liechtenstein on 15 February 1953. The Progressive Citizens' Party won eight of the 15 seats in the Landtag, but remained in coalition with the Patriotic Union. This was the first and only election contested by the Workers' and Peasants' Party.

Results

By electoral district

References

Liechtenstein
1953 in Liechtenstein
1953 02
February 1953 events in Europe